During the time of the Napoleonic Wars and the creation of the Napoleonic Kingdoms and the installation of the Bonaparte Dynasty as rulers. Following the example set by the French Legion of Honour founded by Napoleon (I) Bonaparte several orders were created by the different rulers.

House of Bonaparte

Empire of France 

   Legion of Honour, (1802)
   Order of the Three Golden Fleeces, (1809) Never awarded
   Order of the Reunion, (1811)

Kingdom of Italy 

   Order of the Iron Crown, (1805)

Kingdom of Naples 

   Royal Order of the Two-Sicilies, (1808)

Kingdom of Holland 

   Order of the Union, (1806)

Kingdom of Westphalia 

   Order of the Crown of Westphalia, (1809)

Kingdom of Spain 

   Royal Order of Spain, (1808)
   Order of the Golden Fleece, (1430) Not founded by the Bonapartes'

Coat of Arms 

 
1802 establishments in France
Awards established in 1802
Civil awards and decorations of France
French awards
Military awards and decorations of France
Orders of chivalry of France